Percival Walter "Perk" Galbraith (December 5, 1898 – June 19, 1961) was a Canadian ice hockey forward. He was born in Toronto, Ontario. He played in the National Hockey League with the Boston Bruins and Ottawa Senators between 1926 and 1934.

Galbraith started his National Hockey League career with the Boston Bruins in 1926. He would also play for the Ottawa Senators. He would retire from the NHL after the 1934 season. He won the Stanley Cup with the Boston Bruins in 1929. He is buried in Fort Snelling National Cemetery in Minneapolis.

Career statistics

Regular season and playoffs

External links

Obituary at LostHockey.com

1898 births
1961 deaths
Boston Bruins players
Canadian ice hockey forwards
Central Hockey League (1925–1926) players
Eveleth Arrowheads players
Eveleth Rangers players
Ottawa Senators (1917) players
Ottawa Senators (original) players
Ice hockey people from Toronto
St. Paul Saints (AHA) players
Stanley Cup champions
Wichita Skyhawks players
Winnipeg Hockey Club players
Winnipeg Monarchs players
Winnipeg Victorias players